Taldan is a rural locality (a selo) and the administrative center of Taldansky Selsoviet of Skovorodinsky District, Amur Oblast, Russia. The population was 2,850 as of 2018. There are 24 streets.

Geography 
Taldan is located 85 km southeast of Skovorodino (the district's administrative centre) by road. Gudachi is the nearest rural locality.

References 

Rural localities in Skovorodinsky District